was one of the administrative divisions of Korea under Japanese rule, with its capital at Fuzan (present-day Busan). The province consisted of modern-day South Gyeongsang, South Korea.

Population

Number of people by nationality according to the 1936 census:

 Overall population: 2,214,406 people
 Japanese: 96,926 people
 Koreans: 2,115,553 people
 Other: 1,927 people

Administrative divisions

The following list is based on the administrative divisions of 1945:

Cities

Fuzan (부산) (capital)
Bazan (마산) 
Shinshū (진주)

Counties

Shin'yō (진주)
Ginei (의령)
Kan'an (함안)
Shōnei (창녕)
Mitsuyō (밀양)
Ryōzan (양산)
Urusan (울산)
Tōrai (동래)
Kinkai (김해)
Shōgen (창원)
Tōei (통영)
Kojō (고성)
Shisen (사천)
Nankai (남해)
Katō (하동)
Sansei (산청)
Kan'yō (함양)
Kyōsen (합천)

Provincial governors

The following people were provincial ministers before August 1919. This was then changed to the title of governor.

See also
Provinces of Korea
Governor-General of Chōsen
Administrative divisions of Korea

Korea under Japanese rule
Former prefectures of Japan in Korea